Brenda Sommerville was a female English international table tennis player.

She won a silver medal at the 1928 World Table Tennis Championships in the women's doubles with Doris Gubbins. She also won an English Open title.

See also
 List of table tennis players
 List of World Table Tennis Championships medalists

References

English female table tennis players
World Table Tennis Championships medalists